108 Stars may refer to:

108 Stars of Destiny, featured in the Chinese classic Shui Hu Zhuan
108 Stars of Destiny (Suikoden)
A group of Tao magic user characters in Outlaw Star